Van Someren is a surname. Notable people with the surname include:

Barend van Someren (1572–1632), Dutch painter
Ellinor Catherine Cunningham van Someren, (1915 - 1988), British-Kenyan medical entomologist
Haya van Someren (1926–1980), Dutch politician
Hendrick van Someren (c. 1611–1685), Dutch painter
Victor Van Someren (1886–1976), Australian-born zoologist and entomologist
Nicko van Someren (1967-present), British computer scientist

Surnames of Dutch origin